Steve Michael (April 7, 1956 – May 25, 1998) was a member of ACT UP and in 1996 was the AIDS Cure Party's candidate for President of the United States, with Anne Northrup as his running mate. Their presidential ticket was only on the ballot in Tennessee. He was a critic of the Clinton administration and his stated intention in creating the party and running for office was to "create the illusion of an AIDS voting bloc, and AIDS will become a small part of the media coverage." He had also run in the New Hampshire primaries, receiving a "couple hundred" votes there.

Michael also ran for a Washington, D.C. council seat in Ward 6 in 1997 with his party. He died in 1998. The AIDS Cure Party is now inactive.

References

Further reading
 Michael's GLAA Questionnaire from his D.C. campaign Steve Michael, Ward 6 Council candidate
 "D.C. AIDS Activist Steve Michael Dies at 42" D.C. AIDS Activist Steve Michael Dies at 42
 "Steve Michael political funeral" The ACT UP Historical Archive: Political Funeral for Steve Michael

1956 births
1998 deaths
HIV/AIDS activists
People with HIV/AIDS
Candidates in the 1996 United States presidential election
20th-century American politicians
AIDS-related deaths in Washington, D.C.